Mesorhizobium gobiense is a gram-negative, aerobic, non-spore-forming bacteria from the genus of Mesorhizobium which was isolated from desert soils in the Xinjiang region in China.

References

External links
Type strain of Mesorhizobium gobiense at BacDive -  the Bacterial Diversity Metadatabase

Phyllobacteriaceae
Bacteria described in 2008